Tsiu Hang is a village in the Hebe Haven area of Sai Kung District, Hong Kong.

Administration
Tsiu Hang is a recognized village under the New Territories Small House Policy.

See also
 Tsiu Hang Special Area
 Lions Nature Education Centre
 Pak Sha Wan Peninsula

References

External links
 Delineation of area of existing village Tsiu Hang (Sai Kung) for election of resident representative (2019 to 2022)

Villages in Sai Kung District, Hong Kong